Serine/threonine kinase 11 (STK11) also known as liver kinase B1 (LKB1) or renal carcinoma antigen NY-REN-19 is a protein kinase that in humans is encoded by the STK11 gene.

Expression
Testosterone and DHT treatment of murine 3T3-L1 or human SGBS adipocytes for 24 h significantly decreased the mRNA expression of LKB1 via the androgen receptor and consequently reduced the activation of AMPK by phosphorylation. In contrast, 17β-estradiol treatment increased LKB1 mRNA, an effect mediated by oestrogen receptor alpha.

However, in ER-positive breast cancer cell line MCF-7, estradiol caused a dose-dependent decrease in LKB1 transcript and protein expression leading to a significant decrease in the phosphorylation of the LKB1 target AMPK. ERα binds to the STK11 promoter in a ligand-independent manner and this interaction is decreased in the presence of estradiol. Moreover, STK11 promoter activity is significantly decreased in the presence of estradiol.

Function 
The STK11/LKB1 gene, which encodes a member of the serine/threonine kinase family, regulates cell polarity and functions as a tumour suppressor.

LKB1 is a primary upstream kinase of adenosine monophosphate-activated protein kinase (AMPK), a necessary element in cell metabolism that is required for maintaining energy homeostasis. It is now clear that LKB1 exerts its growth suppressing effects by activating a group of ~14 other kinases, comprising AMPK and AMPK-related kinases. Activation of AMPK by LKB1 suppresses growth and proliferation when energy and nutrient levels are scarce. Activation of AMPK-related kinases by LKB1 plays vital roles maintaining cell polarity thereby inhibiting inappropriate expansion of tumour cells. A picture from current research is emerging that loss of LKB1 leads to disorganization of cell polarity and facilitates tumour growth under energetically unfavorable conditions. A study in rats showed that LKB1 expression is upregulated in cardiomyocytes after birth and that LKB1 abundance negatively correlates with proliferation of neonatal rat cardiomyocytes.

Loss of LKB1 activity is associated with highly aggressive HER2+ breast cancer.  HER2/neu mice were engineered for loss of mammary gland expression of Lkb1 resulting in reduced latency of tumorgenesis. These mice developed mammary tumors that were highly metabolic and hyperactive for MTOR.  Pre-clinical studies that simultaneously targeted mTOR and metabolism with AZD8055 (inhibitor of mTORC1 and mTORC2) and 2-DG, respectively inhibited mammary tumors from forming. Mitochondria function In control mice that did not have mammary tumors were not affected by  AZD8055/2-DG treatments.

LKB1 catalytic deficient mutants found in Peutz-Jeghers Syndrome activate the expression of cyclin D1 through recruitment to response elements within the promoter of the oncogene. LKB1 catalytically deficient mutants have oncogenic properties.

Clinical significance 
At least 51 disease-causing mutations in this gene have been discovered. Germline mutations in this gene have been associated with Peutz–Jeghers syndrome, an autosomal dominant disorder characterized by the growth of polyps in the gastrointestinal tract, pigmented macules on the skin and mouth, and other neoplasms. However, the LKB1 gene was also found to be mutated in lung cancer of sporadic origin, predominantly adenocarcinomas. Further, more recent studies have uncovered a large number of somatic mutations of the LKB1 gene that are present in cervical, breast, intestinal, testicular, pancreatic and skin cancer.

LKB1 has been implicated as a potential target for inducing cardiac regeneration after injury as the regenerative potential of cardiomyocytes is limited in adult mammals. Knockdown of Lkb1 in rat cardiomyocytes suppressed phosphorylation of AMPK and activated Yes-associated protein, which subsequently promoted cardiomyocyte proliferation.

Activation
LKB1 is activated allosterically by binding to the pseudokinase STRAD and the adaptor protein MO25. The LKB1-STRAD-MO25 heterotrimeric complex represents the biologically active unit, that is capable of phosphorylating and activating AMPK and at least 12 other kinases that belong to the AMPK-related kinase family. Several novel splice isoforms of STRADα that differentially affect LKB1 activity, complex assembly, subcellular localization of LKB1 and the activation of the LKB1-dependent AMPK pathway.

Structure 
The crystal structure of the LKB1-STRAD-MO25 complex was elucidated using X-ray crystallography, and revealed the mechanism by which LKB1 is allosterically activated. LKB1 has a structure typical of other protein kinases, with two (small and large) lobes on either side of the ligand ATP-binding pocket. STRAD and MO25 together cooperate to promote LKB1 active conformation. The LKB1 activation loop, a critical element in the process of kinase activation, is held in place by MO25, thus explaining the huge increase in LKB1 activity in the presence of STRAD and MO25 .

Splice variants 
Alternate transcriptional splice variants of this gene have been observed and characterized. There are two main splice isoforms denoted LKB1 long (LKB1L) and LKB1 short (LKB1S). The short LKB1 variant is predominantly found in testes.

Interactions 

STK11 has been shown to interact with:

 CDC37, 
 * FYN
 HSP90AA1
 LYK5
 SMARCA4 
 ESR1

References

Further reading

External links 
  GeneReviews/NCBI/NIH/UW entry on Peutz-Jeghers syndrome
 OMIM entries on Peutz-Jeghers syndrome

EC 2.7.11